Saktigarh Vidyapith (H.S), Saktigarh is one of the first schools of Saktigarh, in the sub-Himalayan part of West Bengal, India. The school was established in 1953. Its original and most popular name was Saktigarh School.

History
The school was started at a site not far from its present location. However, to accommodate the increasing number of students, a permanent building was built. It was established in 1953 as a primary school. Science, Commerce and Humanities could be studied.

Campus
The school has five large classrooms and two small rooms. The southward double-storeyed main building, the laboratories, and a ground.

Extracurricular activities

Sports
Besides annual sports events, the school has a team that participates in the district level championships.

Ceremonies
The Saraswati Puja is an annual ceremony.
An autumn cultural ceremony, including intra-institution award distribution.
In January there is a prize ceremony for students and cultural events organized by the alumni association.

Curriculum
It is a higher secondary school (with primary sections). The curriculum is as per West Bengal Board of Secondary Education (till class 10) and West Bengal Council of Higher Secondary Education (Class 11 and 12). In class 11 and 12, there are three streams: 
Science
Commerce
Arts

Subjects offered: Grade VI to X
English
Bengal
Mathematics
History
Geography
Physical sciences
Life sciences
Computer science
Health and physical education
Work education

Elective subjects
Mathematics
Physics
Chemistry
Biology
Mechanics
Computer science
Bookkeeping and accounting
Additional Biology
Pisciculture
Political Science

Arabic
Sanskrit
Geography
History
Statistics
Business

See also
 Peary Charan Sarkar
 Barasat Kalikrishna Girls' High School
Education in India
List of schools in India
Education in West Bengal

References

 http://schoolspedia.com/website/saktigarh-vidyapith-darjeeling
 http://www.vidyasthi.in/Clients.aspx

External links 

Schools in Colonial India
Primary schools in West Bengal
High schools and secondary schools in West Bengal
Schools in Jalpaiguri district
Educational institutions established in 1846
1846 establishments in British India